Welcome to the Freakshow is the fourth studio album by American rock band Hinder. Released on December 4, 2012 by Republic Records, it is the band's successor to All American Nightmare, released in 2010. It is the final studio album to feature founding vocalist Austin John Winkler.

The album debuted at number 65 on the Billboard 200, with 12,000 copies sold. It has sold 60,000 copies in the US as of May 2015.

Production
On August 9, 2012, Hinder announced, via Facebook and Twitter, that their new album will be titled Welcome to the Freakshow.  The album was released on December 4, 2012. Hinder released the first single, "Save Me," on August 30.  According to Artistdirect, the group, in addition to typical rock music, incorporated elements of pop and country to the album's sound.

In an interview with Billboard, frontman Austin John Winkler said that Welcome to the Freakshow was recorded during "a really, really dark drug binge" for him; immediately after the album was completed he entered a rehabilitation program. He also said that the band wrote about thirty potential songs for the album before selecting the eleven included in the final release.

Austin John Winkler revealed that the album is reflection of "a really, really dark drug binge." He added, "I think you can definitely hear the turmoil in my voice. As soon as we got the record done I went into treatment to get help, and it's interesting to go back and listen to it now. Coming back, I have a whole new look on all of them and they mean something completely different to me now, too, so it's pretty cool. That's the beauty of music."

The album was produced by Hinder drummer Cody Hanson and Faktion's Marshall Dutton  and mixed by James Michael of Sixx:A.M.

Release
The album was announced on October 2, 2012 for release on December 4, 2012. First single "Save Me" preceded the album, having been released on August 30. Hellhound Music called the track "an in-your-face performance of arena rock at its best"

Track listing

Best Buy exclusive:

Personnel
Austin John Winkler - lead vocals, guitars, piano
Joe Garvey - lead guitar, backing vocals
Mark King - rhythm guitar, backing vocals
Mike Rodden - bass, backing vocals
Cody Hanson - drums, backing vocals

Chart positions

References

Hinder albums
2012 albums
Republic Records albums